Kibimba, is a settlement in Bugiri District, in the Eastern Region of Uganda.

Location
The coordinates of Kibimba are 0°31'47.0"N, 33°51'50.0"E (Latitude:0.529728; Longitude:33.863884).

Points of interest
The town is the location of the headquarters and factory of Tilda Uganda Limited, the largest commercial rice grower and processor in the country.

See also
 Jinja–Iganga–Bugiri–Tororo Road

References

External links
  Website of Bugiri District Local Government

Populated places in Eastern Region, Uganda
Cities in the Great Rift Valley
Bugiri District